Yushui Township is a township under the administration of Puge County, Sichuan, China. , it has eight villages under its administration.

References 

Township-level divisions of Sichuan
Puge County